Yovanny Lorenzo (born 13 October 1980) is a Dominican Republic boxer. He competed in the men's welterweight event at the 2000 Summer Olympics.

References

1980 births
Living people
Dominican Republic male boxers
Olympic boxers of the Dominican Republic
Boxers at the 2000 Summer Olympics
Welterweight boxers